Google and the World Brain is a 2013 documentary movie about the Google Books Library Project directed by Ben Lewis, produced by BBC, Polar Star Films and Arte. The main focus in the plot is on copyright controversy caused by the project that resulted in Google Book Search Settlement Agreement. It features interviews with many figures concerned, which include German chancellor Angela Merkel and Creative Commons founder Lawrence Lessig.

The movie has received several awards at festivals.

See also 
 Google Books
 The Virtual Revolution — 2010 BBC film about Internet in whole

References

External links 
 
 

Google Books
Documentary films about Google
Works about copyright law
2013 films
2013 documentary films
Angela Merkel